New Baghdad or Baghdad Al-Jidida is one of nine administrative districts in Baghdad, Iraq. This district has nine Neighborhood Advisory Councils (NAC) and a District Advisory Council. It is located east of the city center.
This district was renamed 9 Nissan or Tisa Nissan. Nissan is the word for April, although most Iraqis do not yet use that name (9 Nissan).  It is also known as 7 Nissan.

Features
 Shaab stadium, Bor Saeid sqr, Martyr's Monument (Al-Shaheed Monument)
 Muthana, Zayouna
 Ghadeer, Masaloon sqr
 New Baghdad neighbourhood (Baghdad Al jadida), Alef Dar, Al Khaleej
 Habibiya, Dur Al Umal, Baladiyat
 Mashtal, Ameen, Nafit, Rustomaniya
 Fedhailia, Kamaliya
 Al Husseinia, Ma'amal, Al Rasheed
 Al-Ubedy, Ma'amil 2

See also

 List of places in Iraq
 Administrative districts in Baghdad

References

External links
 New Baghdad on Google maps
 Washington Post interview with LTC Kevin Farrell

Administrative districts in Baghdad
Neighborhoods in Baghdad